Lali Kiknavelidze is a Georgian film director, film producer and screenwriter.

Biography
Lali Kiknavelidze was born May 12, 1969, in Tbilisi, Georgia. She graduated from Tbilisi State University in 1991 as a philologist. After she is a graduate of the Shota Rustaveli Theatre and Film University (2003). In 2008 she founded a film production company CPU Lira Production, specializing in Feature films (documentaries, fiction, animation,).

Filmography

In development
 A Big She-Bear (scriptwriter Miho Mosulishvili)

Producer
 Geno, 2017
 No. 25 Symphony, 2012
 The Hermit, 2011
 Vacuum, 2009

Director
 Kakhetian Train (2019)
 No. 25 Symphony, 2012

Screenwriter
 Vacuum, 2009
 The Hermit, 2011
 Sunbeam, 2012
 Kakhetian Train, 2019

Cinematographer
 Kakhetian Train, 2019

References

External links

 Lali Kiknavelidze
 Lali Kiknavelidze on EAVE

1969 births
Living people
Film directors from Georgia (country)
Screenwriters from Georgia (country)
Film people from Tbilisi
Women writers from Georgia (country)
Women film directors from Georgia (country)